The Ministry of Education is a ministry of the Government of Malaysia that is responsible for education system, compulsory education, pre-tertiary education, technical and vocational education and training (TVET), curriculum standard, textbook, standardised test, language policy, translation, selective school, comprehensive school.

Organisation
 Minister of Education
 Deputy Minister of Education
 Second Deputy Minister of Education
 Secretary-General
 Under the Authority of Secretary-General
 Internal Audit Division
 Corporate Communication Unit
 Key Performance Indicator Unit
 Education Performance and Delivery Unit
 Integrity Unit
 Legal Advisor Office
 Deputy Secretary-General (Education Development)
 Education Development Division
 Procurement and Asset Management Division
 Policy and International Relations Division
 Scholarship Division
 School Audit Division
 Deputy Secretary-General (Management)
 Finance Division
 Human Resource Management Division
 Account Division
 Competency Development and Assessment Division
 Psychology and Counselling Division
 Information Management Division
 Management Services Division
 Director-General of Education
 Deputy Director-General of Education (Education Development Policy)
 Educational Planning and Research Division
 Curriculum Development Division
 Examination Syndicate
 Educational Technology Division
 Textbook Division
 The National Book Council of Malaysia
 Deputy Director-General of Education (Education Operation)
 School Management Division
 Technical and Vocational Education Division
 Islamic Education Division
 Special Education Division
 Fully Residential and Excellence Schools Management Division
 Sports Division
 Private Education Division
 Co-Curricular and Arts Division
 Deputy Director-General of Education (Teaching Professionalism Development)
 Teacher Training Division
 Aminuddin Baki Institute
 Inspectorate of Schools
 Institute of Teacher Education
 Under the Authority of Director-General of Education
 Matriculation Division
 Johor State Education Department
 Kedah State Education Department
 Kelantan State Education Department
 Kuala Lumpur Federal Territory Education Department
 Labuan Federal Territory Education Department
 Malacca State Education Department
 Negeri Sembilan State Education Department
 Pahang State Education Department
 Penang State Education Department
 Perak State Education Department
 Perlis State Education Department
 Putrajaya Federal Territory Education Department
 Sabah State Education Department
 Sarawak State Education Department
 Selangor State Education Department
 Terengganu State Education Department

Federal agencies
 Institute of Language and Literature, or Dewan Bahasa dan Pustaka (DBP). (Official site)
 Malaysian Examination Council, or Majlis Peperiksaan Malaysia (MPM). (Official site)

Key legislation
The Ministry of Education is responsible for administration of several key Acts:
 Educational Institutions (Discipline) Act 1976 [Act 174]
 Dewan Bahasa dan Pustaka Act 1959 [Act 213]
 Malaysian Examinations Council Act 1980 [Act 225]
 Education Act 1996 [Act 550]

Policy Priorities of the Government of the Day
Frequently Asked Questions about MOE Policy
 Malaysia Education for All, or Pendidikan untuk Semua Malaysia
 Malaysia Education Blueprint 2013-2025
 To Uphold Bahasa Malaysia and To Strengthen English Language, or Dasar Memartabatkan Bahasa Malaysia dan Mengukuhkan Bahasa Inggeris (MBMMBI)
 1 Student 1 Sport, or 1 Murid 1 Sukan
 National Education Policy, or Dasar Pendidikan Kebangsaan
 National Education Philosophy, or Falsafah Pendidikan Kebangsaan
 Education System Chart, or Carta Sistem Pendidikan
 Education National Key Result Area, or Bidang Keberhasilan Utama Negara Pendidikan (NKRA)
 Tenth Malaysia Plan (Education), or Rancangan Malaysia Kesepuluh (Pendidikan) (RMK-10)
 Transformational of Vocational Education, or Transformasi Pendidikan Vokasional (TPV)
 School Based Assessment, or Penilaian Berasaskan Sekolah (PBS)
 Primary School Standard Curriculum, or Kurikulum Standard Sekolah Rendah (KSSR)

Malay name and its function 
In Bahasa Malaysia, it was called Kementerian Pendidikan, and was in charge of all the education-related affairs. In 2004, its name was changed to Kementerian Pelajaran and then became in charge of the education from pre-school up to the secondary level. The tertiary education was taken over by a new ministry, Ministry of Higher Education until May 2013 where Prime Minister Najib Razak announced the two ministries will be merged to form a single Ministry of Education. In 2015, the ministry was split again.

See also

Minister of Education (Malaysia)
Director General of Education (Malaysia)
Education in Malaysia
Early Intervention Centres in Malaysia

References

External links

Ministry of Education

 
Federal ministries, departments and agencies of Malaysia
Education in Malaysia
Malaysia
Ministries established in 1955
1955 establishments in Malaya